Juniper Creek is a  long 3rd order tributary to the Cape Fear River in Harnett County, North Carolina.

Variant names
According to the Geographic Names Information System, it has also been known historically as: 
Stuart Creek

Course
Juniper Creek rises about 1 mile south of Coats, North Carolina and then flows southwest to join the Cape Fear River at Erwin, North Carolina.

Watershed
Juniper Creek drains  of area, receives about 48.0 in/year of precipitation, has a wetness index of 502.31 and is about 21% forested.

See also
List of rivers of North Carolina

References

Rivers of North Carolina
Rivers of Harnett County, North Carolina
Tributaries of the Cape Fear River